The North American Company was a holding company incorporated in New Jersey on June 14, 1890, and controlled by Henry Villard, to succeed to the assets and property of the Oregon and Transcontinental Company. It owned public utilities and public transport companies and was broken up in 1946, largely to comply with the Public Utility Holding Company Act of 1935.

Its headquarters were at 60 Broadway in Manhattan.

Holdings
In 1889 New Jersey passed legislation to facilitate the control of other companies by another corporation with a goal of encouraging trusts to convert into holding companies and relocate to that state. To take advantage of these expanded corporate powers, in 1890 Oregon and Transcontinental, which was an Oregon corporation, re-incorporated as a holding company in New Jersey and became the North American Company.

By 1940, North American was a US$2.3 billion holding company directly and indirectly heading up  80 companies. It controlled ten major direct subsidiaries in eight of which it owned at least 79%. Three of the ten were major holding companies:
Union Electric Company of St. Louis, Missouri 
Washington Railway and Electric Company
North American Light and Power Company

Four of the ten direct subsidiaries were operating companies:
Cleveland Electric Illuminating Company
Pacific Gas and Electric
Detroit Edison Company
Wisconsin Electric Power Company

The remaining three of the ten direct subsidiaries were:
North American Utility Securities Corporation
West Kentucky Coal Company
60 Broadway Building Corporation

At various times during its existence, North American also owned substantial interests in these other companies as well:
The Milwaukee Electric Railway and Light Company: Formed in 1896 as a subsidiary of the North American Company. By 1929, it operated within North American Company along with Wisconsin Electric Power Company, which became the consolidated name of the two operating companies in 1938. It now belongs to Wisconsin Energy Corporation
Capital Transit: Formed on December 1, 1933, in Washington, D.C. from merger of Washington Railway, Capital Traction, and Washington Rapid Transit. North American owned it through its holding company subsidiary, Washington Railway and Electric Company, which in turn was the holding company for the merged lines, owning 50% of Capital Transit.

Potomac Electric Power Company
Cincinnati Gas & Electric Company
Union Light, Heat and Power of Covington, Kentucky
Northern Natural Gas Company
Butte Electric and Power Company
Laclede Gas Company 
Edison Securities Corporation
Wired Radio, Inc. (Muzak)
North American Edison Company
St. Louis United Railways Company

History 
The Public Utility Holding Company Act of 1935 passed with the intent of breaking up interstate electric holding companies by limiting company operations to a single state, thus subjecting them to effective state regulation. The North American Company fought the legislation in court, and the company was not broken up by the Securities and Exchange Commission until their loss before the Supreme court in North American Co. v. SEC on April 1, 1946.

Dow Jones Industrial Average

North American's stock was one of the twelve component stocks of the May 1896 original Dow Jones Industrial Average, but it was replaced later that same year. In 1928, when the number of stocks comprising the DJIA was increased to 30, North American was re-added to the list but was replaced again in 1930. The two periods when it was a component were:
May 26, 1896 – August 26, 1896, replaced by U. S. Cordage
October 1, 1928 – January 29, 1930, replaced by Johns-Manville

See also
John I. Beggs (former director)
Clement Studebaker Jr. (chairman of North American Light and Power Co)

References

External links
Landis v. North American Co.

Holding companies of the United States
Defunct companies based in New Jersey
American companies established in 1890
Financial services companies established in 1890
Financial services companies disestablished in 1946
1890 establishments in New Jersey
1946 disestablishments in New Jersey
Former components of the Dow Jones Industrial Average